Narayana Saw Me is a 2015 Kannada language short film directed by Vishwas Madisetty and produced by Vijay Karthikeyan for Aiikya Films.

The film was nominated for a Karnataka State film award in 2016 and was screened at the 9th Bengaluru International Film Festival in February 2017. It was the first Kannada short film to be screened at Roma Cinema Doc (Rome).

Synopsis
Narayan Swamy is a 70-year-old man who lives in Bengaluru, whose best friends are his radio and his umbrella. When his friends and family ignore him, he recollects his childhood when he meets a kid in a park. After a friendship develops, one day the kid goes missing. Narayana Swamy goes in search of the missing child, and in search of innocence.

Cast
Pranayaraja Dr. Srinath as Narayana Swamy
Akshay Kanakagiri as Narayana Swamy

Recognition
 Best Film - Special Jury Award - 3rd ISSFB, Bengaluru
 Best Director - 3rd ISSFB, Bengaluru
 Best Celebrity Appearance – DR.SRINATH 3rd ISSFB, Bengaluru
 Nominated for Best Film - Karnataka State Film Awards 2016
 SemiFinalist - Wular Lak

Festivals

 9th Bengaluru International Film Festival
 Kinolit Film Festival - Russia
 Roma Cinema Doc - Rome
 Kifaga Niue Film Festival - New Zealand
 Rolling Frames Online Film Festival - Bengaluru
 All Lights India International Film Festival - Hyderabad

References

Indian short films
2010s Kannada-language films